Anthony Gerald Arena (July 2, 1918 – August 18, 1996) was an American football player. He played college football for Michigan State College (later known as Michigan State University). He won the Governor of Michigan award as the most valuable player on the 1941 Michigan State Spartans football team. He also played professional football in the National Football League for the Detroit Lions in 1942.

References

1918 births
2005 deaths
American football centers
American football linebackers
Michigan State Spartans football players
Detroit Lions players
Players of American football from Detroit
Northwestern High School (Michigan) alumni